Huub de Leeuw (15 April 1910 – 30 June 1983) was a Dutch footballer who played as a midfielder for Willem II. He made two appearances for the Netherlands national team in 1929.

References

External links
 

1910 births
1983 deaths
Dutch footballers
Association football midfielders
Netherlands international footballers
Willem II (football club) players
Dutch football managers
PSV Eindhoven managers
Place of birth missing